Hibbertia setifera is a species of flowering plant in the family Dilleniaceae and is endemic to south-eastern continental Australia. It is a small, grey shrub with erect to spreading branches, linear leaves and yellow flowers with eight or nine stamens in a single cluster on one side of two hairy carpels.

Description
Flowering mostly occurs from June to December.

Taxonomy
Hibbertia setifera was first formally described in 2010 by Hellmut R. Toelken in the Journal of the Adelaide Botanic Gardens from specimens collected by Hansjörg Eichler near Kelly Hill Caves on Kangaroo Island. The specific epithet (setifera) means "bristle-bearing" and refers mainly to the outer sepal lobes.

Distribution and habitat
This hibbertia is locally abundant in scrub or mallee on Kangaroo Island, and is rarely recorded on the mainland of south-eastern South Australia and the far west of Victoria.

See also
List of Hibbertia species

References

setifera
Flora of South Australia
Flora of Victoria (Australia)
Plants described in 2010
Taxa named by Hellmut R. Toelken